The Riverbend Maximum Security Institution (RMSI) is a prison in Nashville, Tennessee, operated by the Tennessee Department of Correction. The prison opened in 1989 and replaced its 100-year-old neighbor, the Tennessee State Penitentiary.  RMSI, which is made up by 20 different buildings, sits on  located off Cockrill Bend Boulevard in Nashville.. Riverbend's designated capacity is 714 offenders. Of that number, 480 are classified as high risk.

The prison's overall mission is to ensure the safety of the public, departmental employees and inmates by managing high-risk male offenders. Warden Tony Mays oversees a staff of nearly 400 people, including administrative workers, correctional officers, unit managers and medical personnel.

Education programs at the prison include GED and Adult Basic Education. There are also vocational classes available for printing, commercial cleaning, industrial maintenance, cabinet making/millwork and computer information systems. TRICOR, the prison industry, also manages a data entry plant and print shop at the prison.  Inmates not involved in academic vocation, or industry programs are required to work in support service roles throughout the facility.

Male death row prisoners live at Riverbend. The state's electric chair and lethal injection gurney are located at Riverbend.

Notable prisoners 
 Sedley Alley – rapist and murderer; executed by lethal injection June 28, 2006
 Cory Lamont Batey – rapist in Vanderbilt rape case
 Letalvis Cobbins – convicted of the 2007 murders of Channon Christian and Christopher Newsom
 Robert Glen Coe – child rapist and murderer; executed by lethal injection April 19, 2000
 Lemaricus Davidson – sentenced to death October 30, 2009, for the 2007 kidnapping, rape, torture and murders of Channon Christian and Christopher Newsom
 Daryl Holton – child murderer; executed by electrocution September 12, 2007
 Billy Ray Irick – child rapist and murderer; executed by lethal injection August 9, 2018
 Bruce Mendenhall – murderer and suspected serial killer
 Emanuel Kidega Samson – Burnette Chapel shooter
 Paul Dennis Reid – murderer
 Nicholas Todd Sutton – serial killer; executed by electrocution February 20, 2020
 Philip Workman – murderer executed May 9, 2007
 Edmund Zagorski – murderer executed by electrocution November 1, 2018
 Gerald Lee Powers - murderer of Shannon Sanderson

References

External links

 Riverbend Maximum Security Institution, Tennessee Dept. of Corrections
 Death Row Offenders, Tennessee Dept. of Corrections

Prisons in Tennessee
Capital punishment in Tennessee
Buildings and structures in Nashville, Tennessee
Execution sites in the United States
1989 establishments in Tennessee